Urich is the surname of the following people
Doc Urich (1928–1997), American football player and coach
Robert Urich (1946–2002), American film, television and stage actor and television producer
Ben Urich, fictional uncle of Phil Urich, reporter in works of Marvel Comics
Phil Urich, fictional nephew of Ben Urich, former Green Goblin, and current Hobgoblin in works of Marvel Comics